Crime in Oakland, California, began to rise during the late 1960s, and by the end of the 1970s Oakland's per capita murder rate had risen to twice that of San Francisco or New York City. In 1983, the National Journal referred to Oakland as the "1983 crime capital" of the San Francisco Bay Area. Crime continued to escalate during the 1980s and 1990s, and during the first decade of the 21st century Oakland has consistently been listed as one of the most dangerous large cities in the United States.  

The number of Oakland homicides peaked in 1992, when there were 175 homicides. From the period 1987 to 2012, crime declined significantly, but the city continued to struggle with persistently high rates of homicide and violent crime, fluctuating over time.

Among Oakland's 35 police patrol beats, violent crime remains a serious problem in specific East and West Oakland neighborhoods.  In 2008, homicides were disproportionately concentrated: 72% occurred in three City Council districts, District 3 in West Oakland and Districts 6 and 7 in East Oakland, even though these districts represent only 44% of Oakland's residents.

Homicide rates

The rate at which Oakland Police Department homicide investigations were successfully solved (the "clearance rate") was 42% in 2009, 30% in 2010, and 29% in 2011, much lower than the California statewide rate of 63.8%. A 2012 article in the East Bay Times attributed the low clearance rate in part due to understaffing of the police department and in part to the management dysfunction at the police department, and stated that "In a city where police officers consume more than 40 percent of the municipal budget, are among the city's highest-paid employees, and have exerted an outsized influence on Oakland politics, the department's ability to perform its core missions — solve violent crime, catch criminals, and keep the public safe — is highly questionable." Crime experts said that the city's low homicide clearance rate undermined efforts to control violence. The Oakland Police Department (OPD) had 14 homicide detectives in 2010 and nine homicide detectives in 2011.  A 2007 report by the Urban Strategies Council found than more than 80% of homicide victims in Oakland from 2001 to 2006 were male, and that over the five years, an average of 77% of homicide victims and 64.7% of homicide suspects were African Americans.

Challenges of crime
Crime continues to be a serious problem in Oakland, and the city also continues to have a reputation among its own citizens, its understaffed police force, and residents of other Bay Area cities as a dangerously violent place, with one of the top 20 highest rates of violent crime in the U.S. According to Oakland Police Chief Anthony Batts, during 2011 Oakland has averaged three street shootings per day, some of which cause injury or death to innocent bystanders.

Crime dynamics
Total crime in Oakland dropped by 41% from 1987 to 2012, but the city has consistently been among the highest-crime cities in California; in 2012, Oakland had the highest total crime rate of any California city with 20,000 or more people, with 8,587 total crimes per 100,000 residents, compared to a statewide average of 3,182 total crimes per 100,000 people. Property crime in Oakland declined by 58% between 1988 and 2009, increased from 2009 to 2012 (a period when the property crime rate remained stable in comparable cities and statewide).

Robbery rates in Oakland declined by 60% in the seven years between 1993 and 2000, but thereafter increased, more than doubling between 2000 and 2012. In 2012, there was one robbery per 91 residents, the highest rate in the United States. Carjackings occur two to three times more frequently in Oakland than in other cities of comparable size, and police have recorded at least one reported carjacking in every Oakland neighborhood; in 2005-2007, there were 884 carjackings in Oakland and 334 carjackings in San Francisco, despite San Francisco having about twice as many residents as Oakland.

Crime against the city's taco truck vendors in the Fruitvale district came under scrutiny after the killing of a vendor's 5-year-old son in December 2011. Some truck vendors responded by hiring armed security guards, citing continual robberies and ineffective police response times.

Operation Ceasefire
In 2013, Oakland implemented a gang violence reduction plan used previously in other cities, Operation Ceasefire, based on the research and strategies of author David M. Kennedy.

Domain Awareness Center
The Domain Awareness Center (DAC) is a joint project between the Port of Oakland and the city. Planning started in 2009 as part of a nationwide initiative to secure ports by connecting motion sensors and cameras in and around the shipping facilities. In 2013, the Oakland DAC integrated 130 cameras from the Port of Oakland and four city cameras. By including gunshot detection and license plate readers the DAC would allow police to faster investigate suspects (which does not exactly equal the alleged shift from "reactive to proactive" crime treatment).

Oakland Police Department

Community relations issues

The Oakland Riders scandal involved a group of corrupt Oakland police officers who made false arrests, falsified evidence, and engaged in brutality. In 2003, the city settled more than 100 "Riders" allegations in a settlement approaching $11 million. Over 2001 to 2011 as a whole, the City of Oakland paid about $57 million "for claims, lawsuits and settlements involving alleged misconduct by the Oakland Police Department"—the most of any city in California, and more than double what San Francisco paid out over the same period, even though San Francisco has more than double the population of Oakland. Thereafter, under federal court supervision, the city has undertaken reforms of its police department, although critics say that "the fundamental character of the police department remains hostile to the community and overly reliant on force."

A 2020 report by the UC Berkeley School of Law's International Human Rights Law Clinic, Living with Impunity: Unsolved Murders in Oakland and the Human Rights Impact on Victims' Family Members, criticized the OPD's interactions with the families of homicide victims, writing that the department had failed to make victim services available to the family members of victims; that "law enforcement's treatment of family members at critical moments—during death notification, at the crime scene, and during the subsequent investigation—often generated mistrust, frustration, and stigma"; and that Oakland police made arrests in approximately 40% of Oakland homicides involving black victims, but approximately 80% of homicides involving white victims.
 
A remarkably small percentage of current Oakland police officers (fewer than 9% as of 2013) live in the city itself.

Number of officers
The number of OPD officers has varied over time: there were 626 officers in 1996, 814 in 2002, 793 officers or more than 800 officers in 2009, 626 officers in 2012, and 723 officers at the end of 2015.

The city's strategic plan recommended 925 officers, and an independent study commissioned by the city in the mid-1990s recommended 1,200 officers. 

The Chauncey Bailey Project wrote in 2008 that detective caseload for OPD was more than any other major city in California, except Fresno, and that, in that year, the Police Department had the lowest homicide clearance rate among California's large cities because the department is understaffed and the detective work in certain instances is not as thorough because there are simply not enough officers.

High profile crimes

2000s 

 September 2004 - 16-year-old Greshanda Williams was killed in Martin Luther King Jr. Way with an assault rifle.
 September 2006 - Two women were killed in a drive-by shooting. The shooting occurred at Martin Luther King Jr. Way in West Oakland.
 March 2009 - Lovelle Mixon killed four police officers.

2010s 

 July 2013 - Alaysha Carradine, age 8, was killed by Darnell Williams Jr., who was given the death penalty in 2016.

2020s 
 March 2021 - 75-year-old Pak Ho was murdered during a robbery.
 November 2021 - 1-year-old Jasper Wu was killed in an Oakland freeway shooting.
 August 2022 - 60-year-old Lili Xu was murdered near 5th Avenue and East 11th Street during a robbery.
 August 2022 - A triple homicide occurred in Martin Luther King Jr. Way in West Oakland. Three men (Daven Woolfolk, Tyrone Banks, Tonnell Williams) died at the scene.
 September 2022 - 2022 Oakland school shooting: Six people were shot and wounded near several high schools in East Oakland. One victim died in November.

See also
 Oakland gang injunctions

Notes

References

Crimes in Oakland, California
Oakland, California
Oakland
 Oakland